The Limbach L2000 is a series of German piston aero-engines designed and built by Limbach Flugmotoren.

Variants
L2000 DA
Certified in 1989 as a double-ignition tractor engine with carburettor in the back, top location, alternator in the front, starter in the front. 
L2000 EO
Certified in 1980 as a single-ignition tractor engine with carburettor in the back, bottom location,  alternator in the back, starter in the back. 
L2000 EA
Certified in 1980 as a single-ignition tractor engine with carburettor in the back, top location,  alternator in the front, starter in the front. 
L2000 EB
Certified in 1980 as a single-ignition tractor engine with two carburettors in the back, bottom location,  alternator in the back, starter in the back. 
L2000 EC
Certified in 1980 as a single-ignition pusher engine with carburettor in the back, bottom location,  alternator in the back, starter in the back.

Applications

Specifications (L 2000 E0)

See also

References

Notes

Bibliography

Purdy, Don: AeroCrafter - Homebuilt Aircraft Sourcebook, page 72. BAI Communications. 

Limbach aircraft engines
1980s aircraft piston engines